Macroglossum pyrrhosticta, the maile pilau hornworm or burnt-spot hummingbird hawkmoth, is a hawk moth of the family Sphingidae. The species was first described by Arthur Gardiner Butler in 1875.

Distribution 
It is found in Sri Lanka, eastern India, Nepal, Thailand, central and eastern China, South Korea, North Korea, Japan, the southern Russian Far East, Taiwan, the Philippines (Luzon), eastern Malaysia and Indonesia. It is also an introduced species in Hawaii.

Description 
The wingspan is 42–56 mm. Adults are on wing from April to August in Hawaii and from late June to late October in Korea.

Biology 
Larvae have been recorded on Paederia scandens, Psychotria rubra, Paederia foetida and Paederia tomentosa.

References

External links
"Macroglossum pyrrhosticta Butler, 1875". Sphingidae of Hawaii. Retrieved December 5, 2018.

Macroglossum
Moths described in 1875
Moths of Japan